Gyrocaryum is a genus of plant in family Boraginaceae. It contains a single species, Gyrocaryum oppositifolium, which is endemic to Spain.

Distribution
Its natural habitats are Mediterranean Matorral shrubland, and temperate bunchgrass-grassland. It is threatened by habitat loss.

References

Boraginoideae
Monotypic asterid genera
Taxonomy articles created by Polbot
Boraginaceae genera